Tao Zhinan (born 7 February 1981) is a Chinese professional field hockey player who represented China at the 2008 Summer Olympics in Beijing. The team finished last in their group, and finished 11th after beating South Africa.

References

External links
 
Tao Zhinan Olympic.org

Chinese male field hockey players
Olympic field hockey players of China
Field hockey players at the 2008 Summer Olympics
1981 births
Living people
Sportspeople from Gansu